The 28th America's Cup was contested between the winner of the 1992 Citizen Cup defender selection series, America³, and the winner of the 1992 Louis Vuitton Cup challenger selection series, Il Moro di Venezia. It was the first edition of the America's Cup that was sailed on International America's Cup Class yachts.

This was last Cup of the best-of-seven format held since 1930; the best-of-nine would begin in 1995, continuing through 2007.

Races

Crew

America³

Other crew included Andreas Josenhans and Josh Belsky, Lou Varney and James (Beau) LeBlanc.

Il Moro di Venezia

References
ultimatesail.com

External links
1992 New Zealand America's Cup Challenge on Flickr by Archives New Zealand

 
1992
America's Cup, 1992
Sports competitions in San Diego
1992 in American sports
America's Cup